Nelson Ribeiro Guimarães Airport  is the airport serving Caldas Novas and also the adjoining resort Rio Quente, Brazil.

It is operated by Socicam.

History
Since November 2015 the airport is administrated by the private company Socicam, as a concession from the Municipality of Caldas Novas.

Airlines and destinations

Access

See also

List of airports in Brazil

References

External links

Airports in Goiás